Actual Fucking is an album by Cex released in 2006. Each track is named after and written about a city (Baltimore, Los Angeles, Denton, etc.). The album is heavy on vocals and was released by Seattle label Automation Records.

Both the CD and LP versions come with a booklet of eight anonymous, explicit sex stories written by friends of Cex.

Track listing

Lyrics By Ryjan Kidwell.  Music By Cex.
 "Baltimore" 4:52
 "Denton" 5:52
 "Chapel Hill" 4:22
 "Ybor City" 3:34
 "Covington" 6:15
 "Chicago" 4:08
 "Los Angeles" 6:39
 "Tucumcari" 4:44

Personnel

Cex
Ryjan Kidwell: Vocals
Jason Buehler: Guitars
Cale Parks: Keyboards & Additional Drums
Roby Newton: Bass, Vocal Backing
Mark Shirazi: Drums

Additional Personnel
Jason Caddell: Additional Vocal Backing
Tim Kinsella: Hook

Production
Produced & Mixed By Ryjan Kidwell & Jason Caddell
Engineered By Ryjan Kidwell, Bobby Burg & Jason Caddell
Mastered By Shanw "Twerk" Hatfield
All Songs Published By Pain-Based Lifeform (ASCAP), We Go Towards (ASCAP), Stay And Fight (SESAC) & Songs That Keep Me Here (SESAC).

Production Notes
According to the CD liner notes, "Producers' names contain consecutive Ls (Kidwell & Caddell). Recordists' names contain at least three of the same letter (not true, as the only engineer whose name has three letters is Bobby Burg). Singers always have a W in their names (vocalist Kidwell & bassist Newton). The difference between the number of consonants and vowels in the names of Instrument Players is never four or five. Producers are also Recordists as well as Backup Singers. Singers made the Artwork. The person whose name contains the greater number of consonants wrote the lyrics (meaning Kidwell; his name contains nine consonants).

References

2006 albums
Cex (musician) albums